Abdul Khaleque Molla is an Indian politician belonging to All India Trinamool Congress. He was elected as MLA of Metiaburuz Vidhan Sabha Constituency in West Bengal Legislative Assembly in 2016.

References

Living people
Trinamool Congress politicians from West Bengal
West Bengal MLAs 2016–2021
Year of birth missing (living people)